Jobin is a surname. Notable people with the surname include:

André Jobin (1786–1853), notary and political figure in Lower Canada and Canada East
Christian Jobin (born 1952), Canadian politician and Member of Parliament (MP)
David Jobin (born 1981), Swiss professional ice hockey player
Francis Lawrence Jobin (1914–1995), politician and the 18th Lieutenant Governor of Manitoba, Canada
Joseph-Hilarion Jobin (1811–1881), notary and political figure in Canada East
Maxime Pedneaud-Jobin (born 1968), Canadian politician, Mayor of Gatineau
Raoul Jobin, CC (1906–1974), French-Canadian operatic tenor
Thierry Jobin (born 1969), Swiss film critic, journalist, artistic director of the Fribourg International Film Festival
Tom Jobim (1927–1994), Brazilian composer, pianist, songwriter, arranger and singer
Yolande Jobin (1930–2010), Swiss figure skater

See also
Tom Jobim Airport or Rio de Janeiro–Galeão International Airport, Brazil
Jobbing (disambiguation)
Jobbins
Jobi (disambiguation)